Blue Bridge may refer to:

Bridges
 Blue bridge (Amsterdam), an historic bridge over the Amstel, Netherlands
 Blue Bridge (Saint Petersburg), the widest bridge in Saint Petersburg, Russia
 Blue Bridge (Washington) across the Columbia River in Washington, U.S.
 Blue Bridge (Reed College) in Reed College, in Portland, Oregon, U.S.
 Blue Bridge, Haltwhistle across the river South Tyne, United Kingdom
 Johnson Street Bridge in Victoria, British Columbia, Canada is often referred to as the Blue Bridge
 Blue Bridge in Bow Creek Ecology Park, London

Places
 Blue Bridge, Milton Keynes in England